John P. Quiñones IV  (born April 26, 1965 in Rio Piedras, Puerto Rico) is an American politician. He was the first Republican of Puerto Rican ancestry elected to the Florida House of Representatives, serving from 2002 to 2007, and is a former member of the Osceola County Commission.

He received his Bachelor of Science degree from the University of Central Florida in 1988, and his Juris Doctor degree from St. Thomas University in Opa-locka in 1992.  Quiñones, who was elected in 2002, represented the 49th District of the state, which stretches between Osceola and Orange counties. On February 1, 2007 he resigned his seat in order to concentrate on a run for a newly created seat on the Osceola County Commission.  His campaign was successful and he was reelected in 2010.

In April 2012, he announced that he would be running for the Republican nomination to represent Florida's 9th congressional district in the United States House of Representatives. He came second in the primary with 7,514 votes (28.26%). Attorney Todd Long won the primary with 12,585 votes (47.33%), Julius A. Melendez came third with 3,983 votes (14.98%) and Mark Oxner came last with 2,510 votes (9.44%). Long went on to lose the general election to Democrat Alan Grayson in a landslide.

Personal life
He resides in Kissimmee with his two children, Natalia and Alexander.

References

External links
Official Profile from Florida Circuit-Civil Mediator Society
Official Profile from Florida House of Representatives
Attorney Profile

1965 births
Puerto Rican people in Florida politics
American politicians of Puerto Rican descent
Hispanic and Latino American state legislators in Florida
Hispanic and Latino American women in politics
Florida lawyers
People from Kissimmee, Florida
Living people
Republican Party members of the Florida House of Representatives
University of Central Florida alumni
People from Río Piedras, Puerto Rico
St. Thomas University (Florida) alumni